Tarleton (or Tarlton) was launched in 1789 at Liverpool for Tarleton & Co., a Liverpool firm that had been in the slave trade for three generations. She traded with the West Indies and made one voyage as a slaver. The French captured her after she had landed her slaves. She returned to English hands c.1803 and sailed as a merchantman for some years thereafter. She appears to have been wrecked in April 1818.

Career
Tarletons master was J. Gilbody. 

On 5 August she was on her way from Grenada to Liverpool when a lightning strike damaged her, forcing her to go to St Thomas for repairs.

Privateer
Tarleton and Samuel Gilbody received a letter of marque on 31 May 1793. The size of the crew and the number of guns suggests that Tarletton would operate as a privateer.

They had with them a French privateer of eight guns and 70 (or 72) men that they had captured a few days earlier. This was Guerrier, of Bayonne. Guerrier was 21 days out of Bayonne and had taken nothing. 

On 27 January 1794 Tarleton and Gilbody received a new letter of marque. Now she carried slightly fewer guns, and she had a crew of 36 men, half the size of her earlier crew, suggesting that she had stopped privateering.

Slave ship
In 1796 her master changed to Thomas Cannell, her primary owner to Daniel Backhouse (secondary remained Tarleton), and she became a slaver, making one voyage from the Bight of Benin and Gulf of Guinea islands to Jamaica. She sailed from Liverpool on 2 June 1796, and arrived at Kingston, Jamaica, on 10 July 1797 with 423 slaves. She also lost 6 of her 35 crew on the voyage.

Capture
The French captured Tarleton in 1797 after she had landed her slaves, but before she was able to return to Liverpool.

British merchantman
Tarleton reappears in Lloyd's Register in 1804 with Stoddard, master, Phynn & Co., owner, and trade London–Demerara. She had also undergone a thorough repair. There is no evidence that Tarleton was a prize and the timing suggests that she may have been purchased during the Peace of Amiens.

Fate
Lloyd's List reported that a gale had driven Tarleton, Jefferson, master on shore at the Cape of Good Hope. She had come from Rio de Janeiro. It was not clear how badly damaged she was. She was consequently condemned on the beach. Her cargo, with the exception of some trifling accidents, was saved.

There is no other Tarleton in Lloyd's Register or the Register of Shipping than the Tarleton of this article. Tarleton is last listed in Lloyd's Register in 1818. The Register of Shipping last listed her in 1824, but noted that she had been last surveyed in 1817.

Citations and references
Citations

References
 
 

1789 ships
Age of Sail merchant ships
Merchant ships of the United Kingdom
Liverpool slave ships
Captured ships